The European Dressage Championships are the European championships for the equestrian discipline of dressage. They are held every two years in odd-numbered years. Gold, silver, and bronze medals are awarded in both individual and team competitions. There are also championships held for juniors, young riders, and ponies. Since 2015, the competition has shared a site and branding with vaulting, reining, jumping, and driving events. For sponsorship reasons, eventing is not included, as it is part of the FEI European Championships, echoing the combined World Equestrian Games concept. The first official combined event took place in Aachen in 2015.

History 
The official European Dressage Championship was first held in 1963. Before then, beginning in the 1950s, the FEI has held the FEI Grand Prix annually. The winners of these events were referred to as European champions.

At the official first European Dressage Championship in 1963 it was possible to start with more than one horse, so each rider could win more than one individual medal. Today, each rider can start with only one horse.

The history of team medals starts at the European Dressage Championships in 1965. Two years before, only Great Britain and Romania had three riders at the European Championships (three riders are necessary for a team). However, the rules state that a minimum number of three teams must compete in the team competition, so no team medals were awarded in 1963. From 1963 to 2005, each European Dressage Championship team competition was won by the Federal Republic of Germany, which became Germany in 1990. In 2007, the Dutch team won the competition.

Up to 1991, only one individual prize giving was held. In 1993 and 1995 two individual competitions were held—the Grand Prix Spécial and the Grand Prix Freestyle (also called Grand Prix Kür). The riders had to choose which of the two individual competitions they wanted to start in.

In 1997, the rules were changed again. The riders had to start in the Grand Prix de Dressage (the team competition), the Grand Prix Spécial, and the Grand Prix Freestyle. At the end of these competitions, only one individual prize giving was held. Since 2005, the riders can win an individual competition in both the Grand Prix Spécial and the Grand Prix Freestyle. A rider who wants to start in the Grand Prix Freestyle must start also in the Grand Prix Spécial.

In 2003 the European Dressage Championship was held as the Open European Dressage Championship, but a closed European Championship was calculated based on the result.

Individual results

Team results

All-time medal table (1963–2021)   

 Note 1: Medal count is sorted by total gold medals, then total silver medals, then total bronze medals, then alphabetically.
 Note 2: Germany includes both Germany and West Germany.

References 

 
Dressage events